"Boss Bitch" is a 2020 song by Doja Cat from Birds of Prey: The Album.

Boss Bitch may also refer to:

Boss Bitch, book by Nicole Lapin
"Boss Bitch", song on Lil Baby's 2018 album Harder Than Ever
"Boss Bitch", a 2019 song by Dutch singer Famke Louise
"Boss Bitch", a 2019 song by Brooke Candy featuring Ashnikko from the album Sexorcism

See also
Boss Bitch's World and Boss Bitch's World 2, mixtapes by LoLa Monroe